Ali Khan Jadoon is a Pakistani politician who had been a member of the National Assembly of Pakistan from August 2018 till January 2023.

Political career
He was elected as the nazim of Abbottabad district council in April 2018.

He was elected to the National Assembly of Pakistan as a candidate of Pakistan Tehreek-e-Insaf (PTI) from Constituency NA-16 (Abbottabad-II) in 2018 Pakistani general election. He received 152,203 votes and defeated Malik Mohabbat Khan, a candidate of Pakistan Muslim League (N).

Family 
Son: [[Saad Ullah Khan Jadoon

Father: Amman Ullah Jadoon

Cousin: Noman Sohrani Baloch

Education 
He studied at BeaconHouse Abbottabad

References 

Living people
Pakistani MNAs 2018–2023
Year of birth missing (living people)